Rashon is a given name. Notable people with the name include:

Rashon Burno (born 1978), American basketball coach
Ra'Shon Harris (born 1986), American basketball player

See also
Rashan (given name)

Masculine given names